Hemidictyum is a genus of ferns with a single species, Hemidictyum marginatum, commonly known as the marginated half net fern. In the Pteridophyte Phylogeny Group classification of 2016 (PPG I), it is the only genus in the family Hemidictyaceae. Alternatively, the family, along with Aspleniaceae sensu stricto, may be placed in a much more broadly defined family Aspleniaceae as the subfamily Asplenioideae.

Taxonomy
The name Hemidictyum was derived from the terms hemi (half) and diktyon (net), from the veins being netted only half-way across the pinnules.

Phylogenetic relationships
Hemidictyaceae is considered to be a sister family to Aspleniaceae s.l., believed to have diverged during the Cretaceous period. The following cladogram for the suborder Aspleniineae (as eupolypods II), based on Lehtonen (2011), and Rothfels & al. (2012), shows a likely phylogenetic relationship between the Hemidictyaceae and the other families of the clade.

Species
There is currently only one accepted Hemidictyum species, Hemidictyum marginatum.

Distribution
Hemidictyum is a native neotropical fern, found in Mexico, the Caribbean, Costa Rica, Guatemala, Honduras, Nicaragua, Panama, French Guiana, Suriname, Brazil, Venezuela, Puerto Rico, Bolivia, Colombia, Ecuador, and Peru.

References

Polypodiales
Monotypic fern genera
Ferns of the Americas
Flora of Central America
Flora of the Caribbean
Flora of South America
Ferns of Brazil
Ferns of Mexico
Plants described in 1836
Taxa named by Carl Borivoj Presl